Jeremy Tyndall (born 5 April 1996) is a 1.5 point wheelchair basketball player from Australia. He was a member of the Rollers team that competed at the 2020 Summer Paralympics.

Biography 
Tyndall is from Waaia, Victoria. In 2012, at the age of 16, he acquired T10 level paraplegia after crashing at the Junior Motocross Championships. He attended St Mary of the Angels Secondary College in Nathalia. He has undertaken a teaching degree at La Trobe University.

Basketball 
He is a 1.5 point player. He became a member of the Australian Spinners junior men's wheelchair basketball team three years after taking up wheelchair basketball. The team won the bronze medal at U23 World Championships in Toronto.

At the 2020 Tokyo Paralympics, the Rollers finished fifth with a win/loss record of 4-4.

References

External links 

What a story Australian Roller Jeremy Tyndall has. Truly Made for the Game. Facebook TV

1996 births
Living people
Paralympic wheelchair basketball players of Australia
Wheelchair basketball players at the 2020 Summer Paralympics
Sportsmen from Victoria (Australia)